Georg Ignaz Komp (5 June 1828, in Hammelburg – 11 May 1898, in Mainz) was a Roman Catholic clergyman who was Bishop of Fulda. He was appointed Archbishop of Freiburg but died en route to his enthronement.

References

Sources
 

Roman Catholic bishops of Fulda
Archbishops of Freiburg
1828 births
1898 deaths
People from Bad Kissingen (district)
19th-century German Roman Catholic bishops